Maria Ficzay (born 8 November 1991) is a Romanian women's football defender, currently playing for Fortuna Hjørring in the Danish Elitedivisionen.

She is also a member of the Romanian national team.

Personal life
Ficzay was born in Ocna Șugatag on 8 November 1991 and has graduated in physical education.

Club career
She started playing against local boys in her hometown of Ocna Șugatag when at the age of 15 her uncle, who was a football coach, recommended her to Clujana of the Romanian Championship. She then progressed to Olimpia Cluj, with which she has also played the UEFA Champions League and served as the team's captain.

She joined Medyk Konin during the second half of the 2014–15 season.

International goals

References

1991 births
Living people
People from Maramureș County
Romanian women's footballers
Romania women's international footballers
Romanian sportspeople of Hungarian descent
Expatriate women's footballers in Poland
Medyk Konin players
Women's association football defenders
FCU Olimpia Cluj players
CFF Clujana players